Halec is a genus of prehistoric alepisauriform fish from Cretaceous-aged marine strata of Lebanon

References
http://paleodb.org/cgi-bin/bridge.pl?action=checkTaxonInfo&taxon_no=35568&is_real_user=1

Late Cretaceous fish of Asia
Prehistoric aulopiformes
Prehistoric ray-finned fish genera